Borth railway station is a railway station on the Cambrian Line in mid-Wales, serving the village of Borth near Aberystwyth.

History

It originally had two platforms with a goods yard to the north, but is now an unmanned halt.

The station was host to a GWR camp coach from 1934 to 1939. A camping coach was also positioned here by the Western Region from 1952 to 1962. In 1963 the administration of camping coaches at the station was taken over by the London Midland, there was a coach here from 1963 to 1968 and two coaches from 1969 to 1971.

The original station building still remains and is Grade II listed and in private / commercial use apart from one room, which provides a waiting room for passengers. The station was adopted under the Arriva Trains Wales Station Adoption Scheme and has won a number of community awards.

Volunteers started in January 2011 to convert an unused part of the waiting room and the long-closed booking office into a museum; this was completed in July 2011. The museum now houses various collections, including Village History, Railway & Industrial Heritage, Natural History and Environmental displays.

Facilities
Train running information is provided by the standard combination of digital CIS displays, timetable poster boards and customer help point installed at most TfW-managed stations. Step-free access is available from the entrance and car park to the platform.

In popular culture
The museum and station play a key role in Season 1, Episode 4 ("The Girl in the Water") of Y Gwyll (Hinterland in English), transmitted on S4C in 2013 and BBC One Wales in January 2014.

Services
Trains call at least every two hours in each direction (Mon-Sat), rising to hourly at certain times of day (morning & afternoon peak periods and into the evening). They run to  westbound and either ,  or  eastbound. A similar frequency operates on Sundays, but starting later in the day.

References

External links 

 Borth Station Museum

Railway stations in Ceredigion
DfT Category F2 stations
Former Cambrian Railway stations
Railway stations in Great Britain opened in 1863
Railway stations served by Transport for Wales Rail
Railway museums in Wales
Borth
Grade II listed buildings in Ceredigion
Grade II listed railway stations in Wales